Ee Vazhi Mathram is a 1983 Indian Malayalam-language film, directed by Ravi Gupthan and produced by Thoppil Sebastian. The film stars Shankar, Sukumaran, Sathyakala and Sukumari. The film has musical score by Shyam.

Cast
Shankar as Babu
Sukumaran as Rajan 
Sathyakala as Geetha
Sukumari as Geetha's mother
Kalaranjini as Sharada
Sathaar as Mohanan
Kuthiravattam Pappu as Appu
Meena as Rajan's mother
P. K. Abraham as Menon
Kundara Johny as Johny
Paravoor Bharathan as Vasu
Thrissur Elsy as Sarasamma
Viji Thampi as Police Inspector 
Vijayalakshmi as Bhavani
Baby Sangeetha as Rajani

Soundtrack
The music was composed by Shyam and the lyrics were written by Kallada Sasi.

References

External links
 

1983 films
1980s Malayalam-language films